The 2018 Malaysia Masters, officially the Perodua Malaysia Masters 2018, was a badminton tournament which took place at Axiata Arena in Malaysia from 16 to 21 January 2018 and had a total purse of $350,000.

Tournament
The 2018 Malaysia Masters was the second tournament of the 2018 BWF World Tour and also part of the Malaysia Masters championships which had been held since 2009. This tournament was organized by the Badminton Association of Malaysia with the sanction from the BWF. It was also the first ever new Super 500 Level 4 tournament of the BWF World Tour schedule.

Venue
This international tournament was held at Axiata Arena in Kuala Lumpur, Malaysia.

Point distribution
Below is a table with the point distribution for each phase of the tournament based on the BWF points system for the BWF World Tour Super 500 event.

Prize money
The total prize money for this tournament was US$350,000. Distribution of prize money was in accordance with BWF regulations.

Men's singles

Seeds

 Viktor Axelsen (champion)
 Lee Chong Wei (first round)
 Chen Long (first round)
 Son Wan-ho (first round)
 Lin Dan (first round)
 Chou Tien-chen (first round)
 Ng Ka Long (quarterfinals)
 Wang Tzu-wei (second round)

Finals

Top half

Section 1

Section 2

Bottom half

Section 3

Section 4

Women's singles

Seeds

 Tai Tzu-ying (final)
 Akane Yamaguchi (semifinals)
 P. V. Sindhu (withdrew)
 Carolina Marín (semifinals)
 Ratchanok Intanon (champion)
 Sung Ji-hyun (first round)
 Nozomi Okuhara (withdrew)
 Chen Yufei (quarterfinals)

Finals

Top half

Section 1

Section 2

Bottom half

Section 3

Section 4

Men's doubles

Seeds

 Mathias Boe / Carsten Mogensen (withdrew)
 Li Junhui / Liu Yuchen (quarterfinals)
 Liu Cheng / Zhang Nan (quarterfinals)
 Takeshi Kamura / Keigo Sonoda (second round)
 Mads Conrad-Petersen / Mads Pieler Kolding (semifinals)
 Lee Jhe-huei / Lee Yang (first round)
 Vladimir Ivanov / Ivan Sozonov (first round)
 Chen Hung-ling / Wang Chi-lin (semifinals)

Finals

Top half

Section 1

Section 2

Bottom half

Section 3

Section 4

Women's doubles

Seeds

 Chen Qingchen / Jia Yifan (final)
 Misaki Matsutomo / Ayaka Takahashi (quarterfinals)
 Kamilla Rytter Juhl / Christinna Pedersen (champions)
 Yuki Fukushima / Sayaka Hirota (semifinals)
 Lee So-hee / Shin Seung-chan (semifinals)
 Chang Ye-na / Jung Kyung-eun (second round)
 Tang Jinhua / Yu Xiaohan (quarterfinals)
 Vivian Hoo Kah Mun / Woon Khe Wei (second round)

Finals

Top half

Section 1

Section 2

Bottom half

Section 3

Section 4

Mixed doubles

Seeds

 Wang Yilü / Huang Dongping (quarterfinals)
 Tang Chun Man / Tse Ying Suet (champions)
 Seo Seung-jae / Kim Ha-na (quarterfinals)
 Tan Kian Meng / Lai Pei Jing (quarterfinals)
 Zheng Siwei / Huang Yaqiong (final)
 Mathias Christiansen / Christina Pedersen (second round)
 Lee Chun Hei / Chau Hoi Wah (second round)
 Goh Soon Huat / Shevon Jemie Lai (semifinals)

Finals

Top half

Section 1

Section 2

Bottom half

Section 3

Section 4

References

External links
 Tournament Link

Malaysia Masters
Malaysia Masters
Masters (badminton)
Malaysia Masters (badminton)